Puma Rawkha (Quechua puma cougar, rawkha heap, "cougar heap", also spelled Pumarauca) is a mountain in the Cordillera Central in the Andes of Peru which reaches a height of approximately . It is located in the Lima Region, Yauyos Province, Tanta District. Puma Rawkha lies northwest of Pukyu Rumi and northeast of Mina Ukru.

References 

Mountains of Peru
Mountains of Lima Region